Joseph Wiley (March 1857 January 8, 1924) was a Major League Baseball third baseman who played in one game on June 23, 1884 for the Washington Nationals of the Union Association.

External links

Major League Baseball third basemen
19th-century baseball players
Washington Nationals (UA) players
Baseball players from Philadelphia
1857 births
1924 deaths